Xhevdet Muriqi (Serbian Latin: Dževdet Murići) (born 4 March 1963) is a former Kosovar Albanian footballer who is best known for his time with FC Prishtina during the 1980s as part of the "Golden Generation".

Career

Prishtina
Muriqi played for FC Prishtina for eight seasons in the Yugoslav First League from 1981 to 1989 together with his brother Fadil, Kujtim Shala, Fadil Vokrri and other notable players.

Croatia
In the 1989–90 season together with his older brother Fadil, he moved to NK Rijeka and played there another season in the Yugoslav First League before moving to HNK Šibenik where he spent 8 seasons. He finished his career playing for second league team NK Imotska krajina.

External links
 
 Stats from Yugoslav 1 and 2 leagues at Zerodic
 Sport on Slobodna Dalmacija

1963 births
Living people
Sportspeople from Peja
Association football defenders
Kosovan footballers
FC Prishtina players
HNK Rijeka players
HNK Šibenik players
Yugoslav First League players
Croatian Football League players
Kosovan expatriate footballers
Expatriate footballers in Croatia
Kosovan expatriate sportspeople in Croatia
Kosovan football managers